The 2006–07 season was Football Club Internazionale Milano's 98th in existence and 91st consecutive season in the top flight of Italian football. The team competed in Serie A, in the Coppa Italia, in the Supercoppa Italiana and in the UEFA Champions League.

Season overview
The relegation of Juventus to Serie B due to Calciopoli, and Milan and Fiorentina's penalisations, made Inter a clear favourite for the title: the side was empowered with the arrivals of Zlatan Ibrahimović, Patrick Vieira, Fabio Grosso and Maicon. In early September, the club suffered a tragedy: Inter's president Giacinto Facchetti died at the age of 64, due to a cancer.

The 2006–07 season was signed by records: Inter won 17 games in row for an achievement still unbeaten. Inter also got 11 wins in away matches and obtained the title with 5 games left to play. The side ended with 97 points, 22 over Roma which came second: in 38 matches Inter collected 30 wins, 7 draws and just one defeat (the first in Serie A since April 2006).

Players

Squad information

From youth squad

Transfers

Loan in
  Mario Balotelli –  Lumezzane, season-long loan
  Giuseppe Figliomeni –  Crotone

Out
  Guilherme Siqueira –  Udinese, €750,000, 11 August
  Kily González – released (later joined  Rosario Central)

Loan out
  César –  Corinthians
  Francesco Coco –  Torino
  César –  Livorno, 25 January

Pre-season and friendlies

Riscone di Brunico training camp

Amsterdam Tournament

Birra Moretti Trophy

Trofeo Pirelli

TIM Trophy

Other friendlies

Competitions

Overview

Serie A

League table

Results summary

Results by round

Matches

Coppa Italia

Round of 16

Quarter-finals

Semi-finals

Final

Supercoppa Italiana

UEFA Champions League

Group stage

Knockout phase

Round of 16

Statistics

Squad statistics
{|class="wikitable" style="text-align: center;"
|-
!
! style="width:70px;"|League
! style="width:70px;"|Europe
! style="width:70px;"|Cup
! style="width:70px;"|Others
! style="width:70px;"|Total Stats
|-
|align=left|Games played       || 38 || 8 || 8 || 1 || 55
|-
|align=left|Games won          || 30 || 3 || 6 || 1 || 40
|-
|align=left|Games drawn        || 7  || 3 || 1 || 0 || 11
|-
|align=left|Games lost         || 1  || 2 || 1 || 0 || 4
|-
|align=left|Goals scored       || 80 || 7 ||16 || 4 || 107
|-
|align=left|Goals conceded     || 34 || 7 || 7 || 3 || 51
|-
|align=left|Goal difference    || 46 || 0 || 9 || 1 || 56
|-
|align=left|Clean sheets       || 15 || 3 || 6 || 0 || 24
|-
|align=left|Goal by substitute || – || – || – || – || –
|-
|align=left|Total shots        || – || – || – || – || –
|-
|align=left|Shots on target    || – || – || – || – || –
|-
|align=left|Corners            || – || – || – || – || –
|-
|align=left|Players used       || 25 || 23 || 31 || 14 || –
|-
|align=left|Offsides           || – || – || – || –|| –
|-
|align=left|Fouls suffered     || – || – || – || –|| –
|-
|align=left|Fouls committed    || – || – || – || –|| –
|-
|align=left|Yellow cards       || 84 || 15 || 9 || 3 || 112
|-
|align=left|Red cards          || 5 || 4 || 1 || – || 10
|-

Appearances and goals
As of 31 June 2006

Goalscorers

Last updated: 27 May 2007

References

Sources
Official website

Inter Milan seasons
Internazionale
2007